The 2020 Alpine Elf Europa Cup is the third season of the Alpine Elf Europa Cup, the one-make sports car racing series organized by Alpine for Alpine A110 Cup cars. It began on 22 August at Nogaro will finish on 1 November at Portimão, after 1 triple-header and 3 double-header meetings.

Entry List

Race calendar and results 
The 2020 calendar was released at the end of season awards ceremony for the 2019 season. The series will be traveling to Misano and Portimão for the first time with the latter also becoming the new season finale. The rounds at Hockenheimring and Silverstone have been dropped while Barcelona, and Le Castellet have new dates. On 10 March 2020, the French government banned gatherings of more than 1000 people in response to the coronavirus pandemic. As a result, the Nogaro round has been moved to July. On 27 April 2020, the final calendar was released consisting of four rounds, down from the planned six, and a dramatically changed schedule primarily focused around France with the exception of the final round at Portimão. With this new schedule, the series traveled to Circuit de Nevers Magny-Cours for the first time. The series also utilized a three race format for some rounds.

Championship Standings

Drivers' Championship 

 Scoring system

Points are awarded to the top 20 drivers. If less than 75% of the race distance is completed then half points are awarded. If less than two laps are completed then no points are given. 

†Half points were awarded for the first race at Portimão because the race had to be red-flagged due to an accident and so completed less than 75% of the scheduled distance.

Notes

External links 

 Official website

References 

Alpine Elf Europa Cup seasons
Alpine